Don Nehlen's Tales from the West Virginia Sideline is a late 2006 book written by Don Nehlen, former head coach for the West Virginia Mountaineers, and Shelly Poe, the Sports Information Director at West Virginia University. The foreword of the book is done by Mike Logan, one of the greatest players Nehlen coached.

The book is an autobiography covering Nehlen's 21 years coaching at West Virginia, from interview for the head coaching position, to his final game as the head coach. It deals with Nehlen's coaching staff, greatest games, biggest disappointments, greatest players, team captains, and his two undefeated seasons. The book's final chapter covers Nehlen's induction into the College Football Hall of Fame in 2005.

2005 non-fiction books
American biographies